is a passenger railway station located in the city of Saijō, Ehime Prefecture, Japan. It is operated by JR Shikoku and has the station number "Y32". It is the main station of the city of Saijō and a major terminal on the Yosan Line with many train services beginning or ending here.

Lines
Ishizuchiyama Station is served by the JR Shikoku Yosan Line and is located 117.8 km from the beginning of the line at Takamatsu Station. Connections with other local or limited express trains are needed to travel further east or west along the line.

Layout
The station consists of an island platform serving two tracks. The station building is unstaffed and serves as a waiting room. As it is located at a lower level than the track bed, a short flight of steps is needed to reach the level crossing which connects to the platform.

Adjacent stations

History
Ishizuchiyama Station opened on 2 July 1929 as a temporary stop on the then . On 21 March 1933, it was upgraded to a permanent station. At that time the station was operated by Japanese Government Railways, later becoming Japanese National Railways (JNR). With the privatization of JNR on 1 April 1987, control of the station passed to JR Shikoku.

Surrounding area
The area around the station is a rural area, and there are not many private houses. It is the nearest station to Ishizuchi Shrine, but access to the shrine is not maintained.

See also
 List of railway stations in Japan

References

External links

Station timetable

Railway stations in Ehime Prefecture
Railway stations in Japan opened in 1929
Saijō, Ehime